is the sixth opening theme song from the Japanese anime Kirarin Revolution. The song was released on April 30, 2008 and is performed by MilkyWay, a Japanese project group consisting of Morning Musume member Koharu Kusumi, Hello Pro Egg member Sayaka Kitahara, and Hello Pro Egg member You Kikkawa as their characters, Kirari Tsukishima, Noel Yukino, and Kobeni Hanasaki. The song was released as MilkyWay's first single.

Background and release
"Anataboshi" is the sixth opening theme song to Kirarin Revolution and is performed by Koharu Kusumi from Morning Musume, Sayaka Kitahara, and You Kikkawa from Hello Pro Egg, who play the characters Kirari Tsukishima, Noel Yukino, and Kobeni Hanasaki. The song was released as MilkyWay's debut single.

The single was released on April 30, 2008 under the Zetima label. "Sansan Gogo", the tenth ending theme song to Kirarin Revolution, was included as a B-side and is also performed by MilkyWay.

A video single, referred as a "Single V", was released on May 8, 2008.

Music video
The music video was directed by Hideo Kawatani and produced by Tetsushi Suehiro. The Starlight Headset and Starlight Tambourine featured in the music video were produced as toys by Takara Tomy. The Starlight Headset Mini and Starlight Tambourine Mini were also produced for toddler-sized children.

Reception

The CD single debuted at #3 in the Oricon Weekly Singles Chart and charted for 12 weeks. The video single charted at #22 on the Oricon Weekly DVD Charts.

Track listing

Single

DVD single

Charts

Single

DVD single

References

External links 
 Anataboshi (Japanese) entry on the Up-Front Works official website

2008 singles
2008 songs
Anime songs
Children's television theme songs
Hello! Project songs
Kirarin Revolution
Animated series theme songs
Zetima Records singles